Walter Niemann may refer to:
Walter Niemann (composer) (1876–1953), German composer, arranger, music critic, and musicologist.
Walter Niemann (American football) (born 1894), American football player